The Lunga River is the name of two rivers in Zambia. One is a tributary of the Kafue River and the other a tributary of the Kabompo River, both of which are tributaries of the Zambezi.

References

External links

See also 

Rivers of Zambia